Importin subunit alpha-3, also known as karyopherin subunit alpha-4, is a protein that in humans is encoded by the KPNA4 gene.

Function 

The nuclear import of karyophilic proteins is directed by short amino acid sequences termed nuclear localization signals (NLSs). Karyopherins, or importins, are cytoplasmic proteins that recognize NLSs and dock NLS-containing proteins to the nuclear pore complex. The protein encoded by this gene shares the sequence similarity with Xenopus importin-alpha and Saccharomyces cerevisiae Srp1. This protein is found to interact with the NLSs of DNA helicase Q1 and SV40 T antigen.

Interactions 

KPNA4 has been shown to interact with RECQL and STAT3.

References

Further reading 

 
 
 
 
 
 
 
 
 
 
 
 
 
 
 
 
 
 
 

Armadillo-repeat-containing proteins